Crash of Light is a live album by Norwegian new wave band Fra Lippo Lippi. It was originally prepared for the band's revived record label Uniton Records, but was never released in Norway due to legal problems with their distributor. The album was eventually released on LP, CD and cassette in the Philippines by OctoArts International in 1990.

This live recording is currently available as part of Rune Arkiv's re-release of the band's 1985 album Songs.

Track listing
 "Crash of Light"
 "The Distance Between Us"
 "Everytime I See You"
 "Fade Away"
 "Shouldn't Have to Be Like That"
 "Even Tall Trees Bend"
 "Say Something"
 "Regrets"

Personnel
Rune Kristoffersen - bass
Per Øystein Sørensen - vocals

with

Tore Elgarøy - guitar, backing vocals
Lasse Hafreager - keyboards, backing vocals
Berit Lohne - piano, backing vocals
Bjørn Juliusson - drums

References

Fra Lippo Lippi (band) albums
1990 live albums